Whetstone High School is a public high school located at 4405 Scenic Drive in Columbus, Ohio.  It is a part of Columbus City Schools and the neighborhood of Clintonville. Whetstone's mascot is the Brave.
The school opened in 1961 to accommodate the overflow from North High School. The expanding student base brought on by growth in north Columbus created the need for an additional school.

Curriculum
Grades for all subjects taken at Whetstone HS are included in the computation of a student’s Grade Point Average (GPA).  Middle School courses which were taken for high school credit are also included.  Only Advanced Placement and Post-Secondary courses are weighted.  If a subject is repeated, only the higher grade is used.  For G.P.A. purposes, A=4:  B=3:  C=2:  D=1:  F=0 points.  For weighted courses, A=5:  B=4:  C=3:  D=1:  F=0.

On average, approximately 65% of Whetstone HS graduates enter either a four-year college/university, a two-year institution, or a technical program.  Approximately 50% of graduates acquire the CCS Certificate of College Preparation and 30% receive the Certificate of Specialization.

In 2010, Whetstone received a bronze medal from U.S. News & World Report magazine as one of the nation's top high schools.

Extracurricular Activities

Arts and Music: Art Club, Chorus - Mixed, Concert Band - Beginning & Advanced, Drama Club, Handbells, Jazz Band, Keyboarding, Marching band, String Ensemble, Theater - Fall Play, Theater - Spring Play or Musical, Vocal Ensemble, Yearbook.

Athletics: Baseball - boys, Basketball - girls & boys, Bowling Club - coed, Cross country running- girls & boys, Football - boys, 
Golf - coed, Soccer - girls & boys, Softball - girls, Swim & Dive - girls & boys, Tennis - girls & boys, Track & Field - girls & boys, Volleyball - girls & boys, Wrestling - coed.

Other Clubs & Activities: Cheerleading, Chess Team, Creative Writing, Drill Team, Environmental Club, Gay Straight Alliance, National History Day, 
International Club, In-The-Know (Quiz Bowl) (Academic Challenge), Love is Louder, Mock Trial, National Honor Society, Newspaper - "The Braves Messenger" (formerly "Mocassin Tracks"), Poetry Slam, FIRST Robotics Competition, Senior Council, Student Council, Young Volunteers.

Marching Band

The stylings of the Whetstone High School Marching Band can be traced back to The Ohio State University Marching Band through uniform and showmanship. The WHSMB uniform is based on the OSUMB's uniform, which is heavily influenced by the 1920s U.S Army ROTC uniform.  Whetstone's ramp entrance is based on the OSUMB's traditional entrance into Ohio Stadium. The WHSMB drum major also styles themselves off of the drum majors of OSU with the signature, "Back Bend" and jabs down the field. At each homecoming game, the WHSMB performs its signature "Script WHS", which is derived from "Script Ohio" and is performed to the final section of Edwin Eugene Bagley's National Emblem march.

The school has two fight songs: "Navy Blue and White" and "Polar Pep", the latter of which was originally the fight song for the now closed North High School.

Notable alumni
Andrew Ginther, Mayor of Columbus, Ohio
Jennifer Brunner, former Ohio Secretary of State
Tom Carper (class of 1964), a United States senator from Delaware
Beverly D'Angelo (class of 1969), actor 
Alex Grey (Velzy) (class of 1971), artist
Cheryl Johnson (class of 1964), judge of the Texas Court of Criminal Appeals in Austin, Texas since 1999
John V. Richardson, Jr. (class of 1967), UCLA professor, dean in the UCLA Graduate Division (2002–2007), and editor of The Library Quarterly from 1995 to 2003
Akwasi Owusu-Ansah (class of 2006), football player on the Oakland Raiders
Asia Taylor, WNBA player with the Washington Mystics

See also
Schools in Columbus, Ohio

References

https://nces.ed.gov/ccd/schoolsearch/school_detail.asp?ID=390438000738

External links

Whetstone official website
Columbus Public Schools website
Whetstone High School Parent-Teacher Association
Whetstone Alumni group

High schools in Columbus, Ohio
Public high schools in Ohio
1961 establishments in Ohio
Educational institutions established in 1961
Clintonville (Columbus, Ohio)